Swooner Crooner is a 1944 Warner Bros. Looney Tunes cartoon directed by Frank Tashlin. The short was released on May 6, 1944, and stars Porky Pig.

The cartoon was nominated for the 1944 Academy Award for Best Short Subject (Cartoons), but lost to the Tom and Jerry cartoon Mouse Trouble.

Plot
Porky Pig is the supervisor of the Flockheed Eggcraft Factory, where dozens of hens lay eggs for the war effort (in this case, World War II). The hens suddenly get distracted from their egg laying when a handsome rooster (who resembles and sings like Frank Sinatra) is heard singing outside. Frankie's renditions of "It Can't Be Wrong" by Dick Haymes and "As Time Goes By" (from Casablanca, 1942) causes all the hens to refuse to lay eggs because they are too busy swooning.

When egg production comes to a halt, Porky rushes to investigate and finds all the roosts empty; all the hens have gone to listen to Frankie. Soon, he is auditioning for a crooner of his own to start production up again; showing up are rooster caricatures of Vaughn Monroe ("Shortnin' Bread"), Al Jolson ("September in the Rain"), Jimmy Durante ("Lullaby of Broadway") and Cab Calloway ("Blues in the Night"), none of whom apparently work out.

Porky is on the point of despair when a Bing Crosby rooster (who introduces himself as "The Old Groaner") shows up and provokes a competition with Frankie ("When My Dream Boat Comes Home", "I'll Pray for You", "Trade Winds", "Always in My Heart", "You Must Have Been a Beautiful Baby"). Between the two of them, the overexcited hens' egg production shoots to a level beyond what Porky can handle, including a just-hatched hen chick laying an egg many times her own size.

Surveying literal hills and mountains of eggs all over his farm, Porky is impressed and asks the two roosters, "How did you ever m-m-make 'em lay all those eggs?" The roosters demonstrate their technique, crooning at Porky who, as a result lays a mountain of eggs.

Cast

 Mel Blanc - Porky Pig
 Richard Bickenbach - Frankie, Bing
 Sam Glasser - Al Jolson rooster, Jimmy Durante rooster, Cab Calloway rooster, Vaughn Monroe rooster
 Sara Berner and Bea Benaderet - Hens

Home media
VHS - Bugs & Daffy: The Wartime Cartoons
VHS - Cartoon Festival Featuring "Nothing But The Tooth"
VHS - The Golden Age of Looney Tunes, Volume 9
LaserDisc - The Golden Age of Looney Tunes, Volume 1, Side 9
DVD - Looney Tunes Golden Collection: Volume 3, Disc 2
DVD - Warner Bros. Home Entertainment Academy Awards Animation Collection, Disc 2
DVD/Blu-ray - Looney Tunes Platinum Collection: Volume 3, Disc 2

Production notes
"Swooner Crooner" is the first Looney Tunes entry to be re-released into the Blue Ribbon program. It was re-released on February 12, 1949 with the original opening, credits, and closing titles replaced.
This is the only Blue Ribbon re-release as a Looney Tunes short to keep the original Porky Pig drum ending music. The original ending music was later replaced with the 1995 Turner print, which changed it to the 1941-55 rendition of Merrily We Roll Along, which the DVD sets use as the source of the soundtrack. Later Looney Tunes re-releases that originally had the Porky Pig drum ending would have their ending music changed to the 1941-55 rendition of Merrily We Roll Along by default.
This is also the only Blue Ribbon Looney Tunes short that was re-released with the byline "IN TECHNICOLOR". The rest of the Looney Tunes re-released were re-released with the byline "Color by TECHNICOLOR".

See also
 List of World War II short films

References

External links
 
 

1940s Warner Bros. animated short films
1944 animated films
1944 films
American World War II propaganda shorts
Animated films about animals
Animated films about birds
Animation based on real people
Cultural depictions of Bing Crosby
Cultural depictions of Cab Calloway
Cultural depictions of Frank Sinatra
Cultural depictions of Jimmy Durante
Films about singers
Films produced by Leon Schlesinger
Films scored by Carl Stalling
Looney Tunes shorts
Short films directed by Frank Tashlin
Warner Bros. Cartoons animated short films